Mike Devlin is a U.S. entrepreneur who co-founded Rational Software Corporation, a software development company based in Lexington, Massachusetts.

Devlin graduated from the United States Air Force Academy 1977 after studying electrical engineering and computer science. He completed an M.S. in computer science at Stanford University the following year.

As CEO of Rational, Devlin oversaw the acquisition of several companies, including Objectory AB (1995), and Catapulse (2001), a start-up which was funded by Rational, in conjunction with Benchmark Capital.

In 2003, Rational Software was acquired by IBM for 2.1 billion dollars (U.S), a move that saw Devlin become general manager with IBM. He retired from the company two years later.

References

Living people
Year of birth missing (living people)